Hezaran-e Olya (also Romanized as Hezārān-e ‘Olyā) is a village in Quri Chay-ye Sharqi Rural District, in the Central District of Charuymaq County, East Azerbaijan Province, Iran. At the 2006 census, its population was 45, in 12 families.

References 

Populated places in Charuymaq County